Villa Lobos-Jaguaré is a train station on ViaMobilidade Line 9-Emerald, in the district of Jaguare in São Paulo. In the future, it might be connected with an unnamed CPTM line in project.

History
The station was built by Fepasa in 1979, during the modernization of Jurubatuba branch of the old EFS, and opened on 4 April 1981, named Jaguaré, located next to Villa-Lobos Park, opened in 1994. Since 1996, it is operated by CPTM. It was reformed and reopened on 28 March 2010.

References

Railway stations opened in 1981
1981 establishments in Brazil